The 1904 Wisconsin Badgers football team represented the University of Wisconsin in the 1904 Western Conference football season. Led by Arthur Hale Curtis in his second and final season as head coach, the Badgers compiled an overall record of 5–3 with a mark of 0–3 in conference play, tying for seventh place in the Western Conference. The team's captain was James Bush.

Schedule

References

Wisconsin
Wisconsin Badgers football seasons
Wisconsin Badgers football